Stefani Werremeier (born 17 October 1968 in Osnabrück) is a German rower. She won a gold medal in coxless pairs at the 1990 World Rowing Championships and a silver in the same event at the 1991 World Rowing Championships. At the 1992 Summer Olympics she and Ingeburg Schwerzmann won silver medals in the coxless pair event. In the same event at the 1996 Summer Olympics she and Kathrin Haacker came in 4th. Werremeier also won a gold medal at the 1994 World Rowing Championships as part of the German coxed eights team.

References 
 
 

1968 births
Living people
German female rowers
Sportspeople from Osnabrück
Olympic rowers of Germany
Rowers at the 1992 Summer Olympics
Rowers at the 1996 Summer Olympics
Olympic silver medalists for Germany
Olympic medalists in rowing
Medalists at the 1992 Summer Olympics
World Rowing Championships medalists for West Germany
World Rowing Championships medalists for Germany
20th-century German women
21st-century German women